Aššur-nāṣir-apli I, inscribed maš-šur-PAB-A, “the god Aššur is the protector of the heir,” was the king of Assyria, 1049–1031 BC, and the 92nd to appear on the Assyrian Kinglist. He was the son and successor of Šamši-Adad IV, and he ruled for 19 years during a troubled period of Assyrian history, marked by famine and war with nomads from the deserts to the west. He is best known for his penitential prayer to Ištar of Nineveh.

Biography

According to a royal hymn composed in his honor, he was born “in the mountains that nobody knows,” suggesting he may have been born in exile, or perhaps a literary device, as it continues: “I was without understanding and I prayed not of your majesty.” It relates that, when Ištar appointed him to the kingship, he had restored her overthrown cult. Known from a single copy from the library of Ashurbanipal, it includes a plea to the goddess to restore him to health from the sickness that afflicted him, citing his temple-restoration, and devotions, to persuade her. It addresses Ištar of Nineveh, and Ištar of Arbil, as though they were separate deities. A second, fragmentary literary prayer thanks her for her favor.

A single short brick-inscription comes from his palace in Assur, which was located between the south-west front of the ziggurat and the Anu-Adad temple. The White Obelisk is sometimes attributed to him by historians, but more usually to his later namesake, Aššur-nāṣir-apli II, because its internal content (hunting, military campaigns, etc.) better matches what is known about his reign. The Synchronistic Kinglist gives his Babylonian counterpart as Kaššu-nādin-aḫi (c. 1006–1004 BC), but probably only for stylistic purposes as there seems to have been no recorded contact between the kingdoms during this period.

He was succeeded by his son, Šalmanu-ašaredu II, who mentions him in one of his own inscriptions and later by another son, the long-reigning Aššur-rabi II.

See also
White Obelisk of Ashurnasirpal I

Inscriptions

References

11th-century BC Assyrian kings